Irritant may refer to:

 A stimulus or agent which causes irritation
 Irritant (album), a 2002 psychedelic trance album
 Irritant (band), a United Kingdom rock musical group
 Irritant (record label), a hardcore electro label based in North London